PW van Vuuren (born 10 January 1988) is a former South African rugby union footballer. His regular playing position was hooker. He represented the Cheetahs in both the Currie Cup and Vodacom Cup and has also played Varsity Cup rugby for the Shimlas. He retired from rugby after a serious neck injury in 2012.

External links

itsrugby.co.uk profile

Living people
1988 births
South African rugby union players
Rugby union hookers
Afrikaner people
South African people of Dutch descent
People from Cradock, Eastern Cape
Free State Cheetahs players
Griffons (rugby union) players
Alumni of Grey College, Bloemfontein
South Africa Under-20 international rugby union players
Rugby union players from the Eastern Cape